Matti Maasikas (born 12 June 1967) is an Estonian diplomat. He is the Head of the Delegation of the European Union to Ukraine (since September 2019).

Biography 
He was born on June 12, 1967 in Tallinn. In 1985 he graduated from the 4th Tallinn High School, and in 1993 from the Faculty of History of the University of Tartu.

From 1993 to 1994 he worked as the executive director of the National Museum of Estonia, and later as a consultant to the Estonian Ministry of Defense.

Since 2001 he has been working as a diplomat at the Estonian Foreign Ministry.

From 2001 to 2005 he was the Ambassador of Estonia to Finland.

From 2005 to 2008 he was Secretary General of the Estonian Ministry of Foreign Affairs.

Since August 2010 he was on the team of advisers to the President of the Commission, Jose Manuel Barroso.

From 2011 to 2016, he was Permanent Representative of Estonia to the European Union. During Estonia's presidency of the Council of Europe, Maasikas was appointed as Estonia's Special Representative to the European Union.

From 2016 to 2019 he was Deputy Minister of Foreign Affairs of Estonia for European Affairs. Matti Maasikas' personal signature is under one of the most important documents for Ukraine: in 2017, during the Estonian presidency of the EU Council, he, as a representative of the presidency, signed a decision to grant trade preferences to Ukraine.

From September 2019 he started to head the European Union Delegation to Ukraine, replacing Hugues Mingarelli.

On 7 November 2019, he presented credentials to the President of Ukraine Volodymyr Zelensky.

Family 
His father is Uno Maasikas, an Estonian journalist.

Awards and honors 
 2016: Order of the White Star III class
 2016: European of the Year

See also 
List of ambassadors of the European Union

References 

1967 births
Ambassadors of Estonia to Finland
Ambassadors of the European Union to Ukraine
Commons category link is on Wikidata
European Union diplomats
Living people
People from Tallinn
Recipients of the Order of the White Star, 3rd Class
University of Tartu alumni